Pleurothyrium giganthum is a species of plant in the family Lauraceae. It is endemic to Ecuador.  Its natural habitats are subtropical or tropical moist lowland forests and subtropical or tropical moist montane forests.

References

Flora of Ecuador
Lauraceae
Endangered plants
Taxonomy articles created by Polbot